"Those Oldies but Goodies (Remind Me of You)" is a song written by Nick Curinga and Paul Politi and performed by Little Caesar & the Romans.  It reached #9 on the U.S. pop chart and #28 on the U.S. R&B chart in 1961.

The song ranked #69 on Billboard magazine's Top 100 singles of 1961.

Other versions
Nino and the Ebb Tides released a version of the song as a single in 1961, but it did not chart.
Ted Knight released a version of the song on his 1975 album Hi Guys.
John Cafferty and the Beaver Brown Band released a version of the song on the 1983 soundtrack album for the film Eddie and the Cruisers. Kenny Vance sang lead on the song.

References

1961 songs
1961 debut singles
Songs about nostalgia
Songs about music